Oprah Winfrey's Legends Ball was a three-day celebration held by Oprah Winfrey honoring twenty-five African American women in art, entertainment, and civil rights. 

The celebration included a luncheon, white-tie ball, and gospel brunch. On May 22, 2006, a year after the celebration, a one-hour program about the weekend aired on ABC. It included celebrity interviews and behind-the-scenes moments. 

The 25 women were: Maya Angelou, Shirley Caesar, Diahann Carroll, Elizabeth Catlett, Ruby Dee, Katherine Dunham, Roberta Flack, Aretha Franklin, Nikki Giovanni, Dorothy Height, Lena Horne, Coretta Scott King, Gladys Knight, Patti LaBelle, Toni Morrison, Rosa Parks, Leontyne Price, Della Reese, Diana Ross, Naomi Sims, Tina Turner, Cicely Tyson, Alice Walker, Dionne Warwick, and Nancy Wilson.

Legends luncheon

ABC advertised its television program about this event by describing the luncheon as follows:
The historic weekend began Friday with a private luncheon at [Winfrey]'s Montecito home where the "legends" were greeted by the "young'uns" -- acclaimed stars, including Alicia Keys, Ashanti, Angela Bassett, Halle Berry, Mary J. Blige, Brandy, Naomi Campbell, Mariah Carey, Natalie Cole, Kimberly Elise, Missy Elliott, Tyra Banks, Iman, Janet Jackson, Phylicia Rashad, Debbie Allen and Alfre Woodard, Yolanda Adams among others. Throughout the weekend, the "young'uns" paid homage to the "legends" for their great contributions. World-renowned event planner Colin Cowie attended to every detail, and Grammy Award-winner John Legend performed his hit song, "Ordinary People."

At the end of the luncheon, Winfrey surprised her guests with a parting gift. The "legends" received diamond drop earrings and the "young'uns" received diamond hoop earrings.

White-tie ball
ABC advertised its television program about this event by describing the ball as follows:
On Saturday night, it was an elegant white-tie Legends Ball with notable guests, including Sidney Poitier, Michelle and (then Senator) Barack Obama, Tom Cruise, Katie Holmes, Dr.Rudolph.Kermit King from The Bahamas, Usher, Barbra Streisand, James Brolin, Lionel Richie, John Travolta, Kelly Preston, Diane Sawyer, Mike Nichols, Maria Shriver, Chris Tucker, Barbara Walters, Quincy Jones, Spike Lee and Tyler Perry, among many others.

Sunday brunch
ABC advertised its television program about this event by describing the brunch as follows:
The finale of the Legends weekend was Sunday's exuberant gospel brunch featuring Walter, Edwin, Lynette, and Tramaine Hawkins with spontaneous performances by, among others, Shirley Caesar, Patti LaBelle, Gladys Knight, Dionne Warwick and Chaka Khan.

References

External links
Oprah.com Article

Legend's Ball
2000s American television specials
American Broadcasting Company original programming
2006 television specials